Kristina Romanova is a Russian fashion model. She is the CEO of Aman Essentials.

Career 
Romanova debuted in BCBG in 2010, and walked for Ralph Lauren, Marc Jacobs, Jil Sander, D&G, Alexander McQueen, Jean-Paul Gaultier, and Yohji Yamamoto that season. She has also walked for Moschino, Alberta Ferretti, D&G, and Dries Van Noten.

Romanova starred in the music video for the late Swedish DJ Avicii's 2013 hit song "Wake Me Up",. 

She is the CEO of Aman Essentials, a luxury retail brand of Aman Resorts.

Personal life 
Romanova has two children with real estate developer Vladislav Doronin.

References 

Living people
1994 births
Russian female models
Women Management models
Women chief executives
Chief executive officers